Russell Michael Canzler (born April 11, 1986) is an American former professional baseball third baseman. He has played in Major League Baseball (MLB) for the Tampa Bay Rays and Cleveland Indians.

Professional career

Chicago Cubs

Canzler was drafted by the Chicago Cubs in the 30th round of the 2004 MLB Draft out of Hazleton Area School District. He played in the Cubs organization from 2004 to 2010.

Tampa Bay Rays
Before the 2011 season, in his first year of free agency, he signed a minor league deal with the Tampa Bay Rays, saying later he thought it gave him the best chance to make the major leagues.  He was the 2011 International League MVP after hitting .314/.401/.530 with 18 home runs and 83 runs batted in (RBIs) in 131 games.

Canzler fulfilled his goal in signing with the Rays when was called up to the majors for the first time on September 11, 2011.

Cleveland Indians
Canzler was traded to the Cleveland Indians on January 31, 2012 in exchange for cash considerations. Canzler was designated for assignment on December 19, 2012 to make room on the 40-man roster for Mark Reynolds.

Baltimore Orioles
The Toronto Blue Jays claimed Canzler off waivers from the Cleveland Indians on December 21, 2012. Cleveland reacquired Canzler off waivers from Toronto on January 2, 2013, then the New York Yankees claimed him off waivers from the Indians a day later on January 4, 2013. The Yankees designated Canzler for assignment on February 1, when they signed Travis Hafner.  He was claimed off waivers by the Baltimore Orioles on February 5, 2013.

Pittsburgh Pirates
On July 12, 2013, Canzler was traded to the Pittsburgh Pirates for Tim Alderson. He was designated for assignment on August 27, 2013.

New York Yankees
Canzler signed a minor league deal with the New York Yankees in October 2013. 
On June 21, 2014, he was released by the Yankees.

Philadelphia Phillies
Canzler signed a minor league contract with the Philadelphia Phillies on June 26, 2014, and was assigned to the Phillies' Triple-A affiliate, the Lehigh Valley IronPigs. On November 13, 2014, Canzler was re-signed by the Phillies. He elected free agency on November 6, 2015.

References

External links

1986 births
Living people
Tampa Bay Rays players
Cleveland Indians players
Arizona League Cubs players
Boise Hawks players
Peoria Chiefs players
Daytona Cubs players
Tennessee Smokies players
Durham Bulls players
Columbus Clippers players
Norfolk Tides players
Indianapolis Indians players
Scranton/Wilkes-Barre RailRiders players
Lehigh Valley IronPigs players
People from Hazleton, Pennsylvania
People from Berwick, Pennsylvania
Baseball players from Pennsylvania
Major League Baseball third basemen
International League MVP award winners